Marong is a Gambian surname. Notable people with the surname include:
 Bubacarr Marong (born 2000), Gambian footballer
 Edrissa Marong (1996/7–2023), Gambian long distance runner
 Nuha Marong (born 1993), Spanish-born Gambian footballer
 Ousman Marong (born 1999), Gambian footballer

References

Gambian surnames